Jadranko is a Slavic male given name commonly found in Croatia, Serbia, Russia, Ukraine, Bulgaria, North Macedonia, and Bosnia and Herzegovina. It is derived from Jadran, which means "The Adriatic" in South Slavic languages.

In Slovenia, the name Jadranko is on the 930th place.

Notable people
Jadranko Bogičević (born 1983), Bosnian Serb footballer
Jadranko Crnić (1928–2008), Croatian lawyer, former chairman of the Croatian Constitutional Court
Jadranko Džihan (born 1964), Bosnian musician
Jadranko Prlić (born 1951), Bosnian Croat politician
Jadranko Topić (born 1949), retired Yugoslav footballer

See also
Adrian

References

Slovene masculine given names
Croatian masculine given names
Serbian masculine given names
Macedonian masculine given names
Bulgarian masculine given names
Ukrainian masculine given names